Helga María Sista (born 12 May 1947) is an Argentine alpine skier. She competed in two events at the 1968 Winter Olympics.

References

1947 births
Living people
Argentine female alpine skiers
Olympic alpine skiers of Argentina
Alpine skiers at the 1968 Winter Olympics
Skiers from Munich